Vashkivtsi is a village in Dnistrovskyi Raion, Chernivtsi Oblast, Ukraine. It hosts the administration of Vashkivtsi rural hromada, one of the hromadas of Ukraine.

Until 18 July 2020, Vashkivtsi belonged to Sokyriany Raion. The raion was abolished in July 2020 as part of the administrative reform of Ukraine, which reduced the number of raions of Chernivtsi Oblast to three. The area of Sokyriany Raion was merged into Dnistrovskyi Raion.

Demographics
According to the 1989 census, the population of Vashkivtsi was 3,680 people, of whom 1,718 were men and 1,962 women.

Native language as of the Ukrainian Census of 2001:
 Ukrainian 97.18%
 Moldovan (Romanian) 1.62%
 Russian 1.12%
 Belarusian 0.06%
 Romanian 0.03%

References

Villages in Dnistrovskyi Raion